Pine Camp is a neighborhood in Richmond, Virginia's North Side. The area is heavily forested, and houses the Pine Camp Community Center, one of the largest recreational centers in Northern Richmond. The neighborhood is north of John Marshall High School and west of the Forest Lawn Cemetery.

External links 
 Map of Pine Camp boundaries

Neighborhoods in Richmond, Virginia